Leucopogon flexifolius is a species of flowering plant in the family Ericaceae and is endemic to south-east Queensland. It is a rigid shrub with many softly-hairy branchlets, crowded, sharply-pointed linear to lance-shaped leaves, and small, white, bell-shaped flowers that are bearded inside.

Description

Taxonomy
Leucopogon flexifolius was first formally described in 1810 by Robert Brown in his Prodromus Florae Novae Hollandiae et Insulae Van Diemen from specimens he collected at Shoalwater Bay. The specific epithet (flexifolius) means "pliable-leaved".

Distribution
This leucopogon grows in south-east Queensland.

References

flexifolius
Ericales of Australia
Flora of Queensland
Plants described in 1810
Taxa named by Robert Brown (botanist, born 1773)